The Sugar Regulatory Administration (SRA; Filipino: Pangasiwaan sa Regulasyon ng Asukal; Hiligaynon: Administrasyon sa Regulasyon sang Kalamay) is a government-owned and controlled corporation attached to the Department of Agriculture of the Philippines who is responsible for promoting the growth and development of the sugar industry of the Philippines through greater participation of the private sector and to improve the working conditions of the laborers.

History
On September 16, 1937, the National Assembly authorized the Philippine Commonwealth president to create the Philippine Sugar Administration (PSA).

Post-independence
After the Philippine independence in 1946, the office was renamed in 1951 the Sugar Quota Administration (SQA). The office undertook the allocation and administration of export, domestic reserve and world sugar quota, issuances of quedan permits, and verifying and recording transfers or assignments of allotments.

In order to improve productivity, the Philippine Sugar Institute (PHILSUGIN) was created on June 16, 1951, under Republic Act 632. The agency was tasked to conduct research work for the sugar industry in all its phases, agricultural and industrial.

Early in the 1960s, relationships between the United States and Cuba—one of the top sugar-producing countries of the world—became strained after the communist revolution in Cuba. This proved favorable for the Philippines and the other sugar-exporting countries as policies for expansion were issued to the mills and has opened greater areas for sugar cane planting.

Marcos regime

In 1977, the Philippine Sugar Commission (PHILSUCOM) was created by virtue of P.D. No. 388 to further bolster the revitalization of the sugar industry. It was amended by P.D. 775 and 1192. The decree integrated the functions of PHILSUGIN, SQA and PNB Philex.

The National Sugar Trading Corporation (NASUTRA), an affiliate of PHILSUCOM was then established for the purpose of reinvigorating the industry as a result of the slump brought about by the cancellation of US sugar quota system.

Present period
After the People Power Revolution in 1986, new president Corazon Aquino through Executive Order 18 established the Sugar Regulatory Administration (SRA). Free enterprise trading of sugar is allowed to prevail, although the production of the same should be regulated and supported by an innovative research and development program and a socio-economic program which is primarily the private sector's responsibility. The SRA is mandated to promote the growth and development of the sugar industry through greater and significant participation of the private sector and to improve the working conditions of laborers. Thus, the agency concentrates its efforts on effectively discharging regulatory, R and D socio-economic activities such as the livelihood programs for the sugar workers.

The first sugar board was composed of Arsenio B. Yulo, Jr., as Chairman-Administrator and two Board Members Bibiano C. Sabino and Carlos Ledesma representing the planters and millers respectively.

Offices
Sugar Regulatory Administration holds office at the Sugar Center, a facility built during the Marcos era, situated in a compound housing other agencies of the Department of Agriculture, located in North Avenue, Quezon City. It sits beside Veterans Memorial Medical Center compound. As part of decentralizing functions, Sugar Regulatory Administration also holds office in the SRA Compound along Araneta Street, Bacolod, the capital of sugar-rich Province of Negros Occidental. It has jurisdiction over Visayas and Mindanao.

See also
 Sugar industry of the Philippines
 Sugar Alliance of the Philippines

References

External links
SRA Homepage
SRA Visayas Homepage
SRA-LGAREC Homepage

Department of Agriculture (Philippines)
Government-owned and controlled corporations of the Philippines
Sugar industry